Harsud was a town and municipality in Khandwa in the Indian state of Madhya Pradesh. Although the town was more than 700 years old, it was submerged under the waters of the Indira Sagar dam in July 2004.

Geography
The town was relocated to Chhanera (New Harsud) after the old town was submerged.

Wards
15 Wards in Harsud

Demographics
As of the 2001 Indian census, Harsud had a population of 15,871, and was 52% male and 48% female. Harsud's average literacy rate of 69%, 77% male literacy and 61% female literacy, was higher than the national average of 59.5%. 14% of Harsud's population was under 6 years of age.

Religions 

As of the 2011 Indian census

Hindu                   81.87%

Muslim                16.61%

Jain                      01.16%

Christian               0.32%

Sikh                        0.01%

Others                    0.02%

References

Cities and towns in Khandwa district
Khandwa